Froska Kostova (born 5 November 1988) is a Macedonian footballer who plays as a goalkeeper. She has been a member of the North Macedonia women's national team.

References

1988 births
Living people
Women's association football goalkeepers
Macedonian women's footballers
North Macedonia women's international footballers
KF Vllaznia Shkodër players
Macedonian expatriate  footballers
Macedonian expatriate sportspeople in Albania
Expatriate footballers in Albania